Conus hamamotoi is a species of sea snail, a marine gastropod mollusk in the family Conidae, the cone snails and their allies.

Like all species within the genus Conus, these snails are predatory and venomous. They are capable of "stinging" humans, therefore live ones should be handled carefully or not at all.

Description
The size of the shell varies between 18 mm and 24 mm.

Distribution
This marine species occurs off Japan, New Caledonia and in the Coral Sea

References

 Yoshiba, S. and Koyama, Y. 1984. Description of a new species of cone shell from Shiono-misaki Peninsula, Wakayama Pref. Venus 43(2):115–123, 1 fig. 1 pl.
 Puillandre N., Duda T.F., Meyer C., Olivera B.M. & Bouchet P. (2015). One, four or 100 genera? A new classification of the cone snails. Journal of Molluscan Studies. 81: 1–23

External links
 The Conus Biodiversity website
 

hamamotoi
Gastropods described in 1984